Oravice may refer to:

Oravița, a town in southwestern Romania
Oravice (Slovakia), a town in northern Slovakia